The 2001 Florida Atlantic University Owls football team represented Florida Atlantic University in the 2001 NCAA Division I-AA football season. The team was coached by Howard Schnellenberger and played their home games at Pro Player Stadium in Miami Gardens, FL.  The Owls competed in the NCAA's Division I-AA as an Independent.  This was the inaugural season for the program that Schnellenberger started from scratch in 1998, working out of a trailer and holding practices in local high school gymnasiums.

Schedule

References

Florida Atlantic
Florida Atlantic Owls football seasons
Florida Atlantic Owls football